Nanodobenus is an extinct genus of pinniped that lived approximately 15.97 to 7.246 mya during the Miocene in what is now Baja California Sur, Mexico. It belonged to the family Odobenidae, the only extant species of which is the walrus.

Discovery 
N. arandai is known from a partially complete left mandible and a right calcaneum bone, discovered in the Torgugas Formation in Mexico.

Description 
Nanodobenus were more similar in appearance to modern fur seals and sea lions than walruses. They lacked the long tusks of walruses, and were more slender and smaller than their modern relatives.

Despite the general increase in body size of odobenids from the Miocene to Pliocene, Nanodobenus were the smallest members of Odobenidae.

Taxonomy 
Nanodobenus is a relatively basal species of odobenid.

References 

Odobenids
Prehistoric pinnipeds of North America
Prehistoric carnivoran genera
Prehistoric monotypic mammal genera